Sadappa Muniswamy (b 1975) is an Indian politician, a member of Bharatiya Janata Party (BJP). He was elected to the Lok Sabha, lower house of the Parliament of India, from Kolar in Karnataka in 2019 as a BJP candidate after causing massive upset by defeating congress heavyweight, former central minister  and seven time member of parliament K. H. Muniyappa in his own bastion.
Muniswamy participated in the launch of a new train service from Kolar to Whitefield and during the occasion promised to take up the doubling work of railway line between Marikuppam and Bangarpet-Kolar-Bangarpet.

In just a decade and half his political fortunes have skyrocketed from being a panchayat member to Member of Parliament. He was first elected in Kadugodi in Panchayat elections. Later he became a Corporator from Kadugodi Ward in Bangalore after winning BBMP elections in 2015. S. Muniswamy had unsuccessfully contested for mayoral election, but lost against Sampath Raju of Congress in 2018.

Controversy
On Womens Day event , Muniswamy scolded a women vendor for not wearing bindi. Critising it Congress MP P. Chidambaram said BJP will one day make India "Hindutva Iran".

References

External links
 Official biographical sketch in Parliament of India website

India MPs 2019–present
Lok Sabha members from Karnataka
Living people
Bharatiya Janata Party politicians from Karnataka
People from Kolar
1975 births